The Slap Maxwell Story (sometimes seen in print as The "Slap" Maxwell Story) is a sitcom broadcast in the United States by ABC as part of its 1987–88 lineup.

It starred Dabney Coleman as "Slap" Maxwell, an egocentric sportswriter for a newspaper called The Ledger, somewhere in the American Southwest. The Ledger is an old-fashioned newspaper, and Slap is an old-fashioned man, who composes his "Slap Shots" column on a typewriter. Despite the newly litigious environment of journalism, Slap insists on filling his column with rumor and innuendo, which draws lawsuits and frequently results in Slap's termination. After each termination, Slap makes groveling apologies and is rehired.

The title character's nickname comes from the fact that someone else always ends up hitting him in every episode.

Slap has an on-again, off-again relationship with Judy (Megan Gallagher), one of the paper's secretaries. The series also featured Annie (Susan Anspach) as Slap's ex-wife, who retains a soft spot for him.

The show was created by Jay Tarses, who in 1983 was co-creator of Buffalo Bill, an NBC sitcom in which Coleman starred as an off-putting talk show host.

Cast
Dabney Coleman as "Slap" Maxwell
Megan Gallagher as Judy
Brian Smiar as Nelson Kruger
Bill Cobbs as The Dutchman
Bill Calvert as Charlie Wilson
Susan Anspach as Annie

Further reading
Brooks, Tim and Marsh, Earle, The Complete Directory to Prime Time Network and Cable TV Shows

References

External links
 

American Broadcasting Company original programming
1980s American sitcoms
1980s American workplace comedy television series
1987 American television series debuts
1988 American television series endings
Television series about journalism
Television series by Warner Bros. Television Studios
Television shows set in New York City